The Jews in Bukovina have been an integral part of their community. Under Austria-Hungary, there was tolerance of Jews and inter-ethnic cooperation.

Life under Austria and Romania 
Bukovina was conquered by the Austrian Archduchy in 1774. It developed into one of the most diverse provinces in the Archduchy and later in the Austrian Empire; it was also the province with one of the highest Jewish populations.

The first Austrian census reported a population of 526 Jewish families. As immigration from Galicia, Moldova, and Ukraine grew, the Austrian authorities began to deport the newcomers. Some laws against Jews were revoked in the 1810s. There was a gradual elimination of discrimination of Jews after the 1848 revolution, leading up to all laws against them being removed in 1867. Many of the Jews in Bukovina, along with Germans, immigrated to North America in the late 19th and early 20th century. Despite this, Austria's census reported over 12% Jewish population in Bukovina. When Austria-Hungary collapsed in 1918, Romania took control of Bukovina. In the early 1920s, state posts began to require native Romanian language skills. This law served to legitimize further anti-Semitic legislation. In the late 1930s under Romania, their citizenship was revoked in order with Germany's anti-Semitic policies. Like Germany's Jews, they were additionally sent to forced-labor camps.

Soviet occupation and Axis period 
The Soviet Union occupied the northern part of Bukovina on 3 July 1940. Some communist and pro-Soviet Jews attacked ethnic Romanians and the retreating Romanian soldiers. As Romanian troops retreated from the area, they carried out a pogrom against the local Jews in Dorohoi. The Romanian authorities saw the pogrom as a revenge for the crimes committed by the communists in the territories annexed by the Soviets. Many were deported to Siberia from that region following the takeover, including a disproportionate amount of Jews. A year later, the Axis invaded the Soviet Union and Northern Bukovina was reoccupied in June–July 1941. This reoccupation had a disastrous effect on the Jewish population, as the invading Nazi and Romanian soldiers immediately began to massacre Jews. The survivors were forced into ghettos, awaiting their transfer to work camps in Transnistria. 57,000 had arrived there by November 1941, including about 3,000 from Dorohoi. In October 1943, the law forcing Jews to wear the Star of David was revoked, and Jews were allowed to move freely around the capital city. By the time Bukovina was retaken by Soviet forces in February 1944, less than half of the entire Jewish population in the region had survived. Most of them went to Romania after the war, where the more liberal policies allowed emigration to Israel.

An organization of Jews from Bukovina, known as Landsmannschaft, was founded in Tel Aviv in 1944 by Manfred Reifer. They adopted radical Zionist beliefs. Bukovinian Jews living in the United States helped to create the Museum of Bukovinian Jewry in 2008.

Traian Popovici and the Jews of Cernăuți
In 1941, the new governor announced his decision that all the Jews of Cernăuți must be deported to Transnistria. After talks with the governor, the latter agreed that Traian Popovici, the new mayor of Cernăuți under Romanian administration, would be allowed to nominate 200 Jews which were to be exempted. Unsatisfied with the modest concession, Popovici tried reaching Antonescu himself, this time arguing that Jews were of capital importance to Cernăuți's economy and requested a postponement until replacements could be found. As a result, he was allowed to expand the list, which covered 20,000 Jews in its final version.

Traian Popovici is honored by Israel's Yad Vashem memorial as one of the Righteous Among the Nations, an honour given to non-Jews who behaved with heroism in trying to save Jews from the genocide of the Holocaust.

See also 
Galician Jews
Emigration of Jews from Romania
History of the Jews in Bessarabia
Diana Dumitru, Moldovan researcher of the Holocaust in Bukovina

References 

 
Bukovina
Bukovina
Bukovina
History of Bukovina
History of Chernivtsi Oblast